USS Alamosa (AK-156) was the lead ship of the s, commissioned by the US Navy for service in World War II. She was responsible for delivering troops, goods and equipment to locations in the war zone.

Service history
Alamosa was laid down under a Maritime Commission contract, MC hull 2101, on 15 November 1943 at Richmond, California, by Kaiser Cargo, Inc.; launched on 14 April 1944; sponsored by Mrs. J.J. Mullane; and acquired by the Navy and commissioned on 10 August 1944. Alamosa class cargo ships are named after United States Counties. After a brief fitting out period in the San Francisco Bay area, Alamosa sailed for Portland, Oregon. There the ship entered the Commercial Iron Works yards and was decommissioned on 25 August for conversion to an ammunition issue ship. She was recommissioned on 25 September and got underway on 6 October for shakedown out of San Pedro, California. After taking on ammunition at Mare Island, California, Alamosa set sail on November [...] for the Marshall Islands.

Upon arriving at Eniwetok on 7 December, Alamosa was assigned to Service Squadron 8. For the duration of World War II, the vessel carried ammunition and cargo between Eniwetok, Saipan, Guam, Ulithi, Peleliu, and Leyte. After the end of hostilities, Alamosa entered dry dock at Apra Harbor, Guam, on 1 October 1945. Following the completion of repairs, she got underway again on 7 January 1946, bound for home. She arrived at Seattle, Washington, on 27 January; was decommissioned there on 20 May 1946; and was turned over to the Maritime Commission's War Shipping Administration for disposal. Her name was struck from the Navy list on 14 June 1946. The ship was sold for $6,227.22, to American Ship Dismantlers, Inc., on 19 May 1972, for non-transportation use.

Notes

Bibliography

External links

 

Alamosa-class cargo ships
Alamosa County, Colorado
Ships built in Richmond, California
1944 ships
World War II auxiliary ships of the United States